Ed Simons may refer to:

Ed Simons (conductor) (1917–2018), American conductor
Ed Simons (musician) (born 1970), English musician, one of The Chemical Brothers